King's Highway 40, commonly referred to as Highway 40, is a provincially maintained highway in the southwestern portion of the Canadian province of Ontario. The  route links Chatham and Sarnia via Wallaceburg, following close to the St. Clair River. The southern terminus is at Highway 401 south of Chatham, while the northern terminus is at Highway 402 in Sarnia. The portion of Highway 40 between Highway 401 and north of Wallaceburg is within the municipality of Chatham-Kent, while the portion north of there is within Lambton County.

Highway 40 was built as a depression-relief project in 1934. The original routing followed what is now the St. Clair Parkway, but was rerouted to create that scenic road in the mid-1970s. The Sarnia Bypass was opened in 1963 as Highway 40A and renumbered as Highway 40 by 1966; the original route through Sarnia became Highway 40B until it was decommissioned during the early-1990s. The route was extended to Highway 3 in Blenheim during the early 1970s; however this section was decommissioned during the Ontario highway transfers in 1998.

Route description 

Highway 40 begins at an interchange with Highway 401 (Exit 90) southeast of the urban centre of Chatham, within the municipality of Chatham-Kent.
Southwest of the interchange is C.M. Wilson Conservation Area, a  campground named for the former Chair of Directors of the Lower Thames Valley Conservation Authority, Clarence Michael Wilson.
The highway proceeds northwest as Communication Road, passing between farmland on the outskirts of Chatham. It crosses a Canadian National Railway (CN) mainline followed by the Thames River, then turns southwest onto Grand Avenue East and crosses a Canadian Pacific (CP) railway line. The highway progresses from the outskirts of Chatham to downtown before turning onto St. Clair Street and travelling northwest. It encounters the Nortown Centre mall as it passes through the suburbs and eventually leaves the city.

The African-Canadian Heritage Tour (ACHT) follows a portion of Highway 40 from Highway 401 to Chatham-Kent Road 29 (Countryview Line) at Oungah, where it turns east towards Dresden.
The ACHT was begun in 1991, and by 1997 was the most successful heritage tour in North America.
However, under a new tourism signage policy, markers signing the ACHT were removed from Highway 40 in 1998.

Oungah is the only community between Chatham and Wallaceburg, where the highway divides a large swath of farmland established in the fertile soils of the region.
Immediately southeast of Wallaceburg, the highway turns to the north and becomes known as Murray Street. As it enters the town, it turns onto McNaughton Avenue and crosses a CSX railway line then the Sydenham River. The route turns west onto Dufferin Avenue and proceeds out of the town, crossing the CSX railway a second time. After crossing an irrigation canal, Highway 40 turns north onto Arnold Road and crosses the CSX railway a third and final time before exiting Chatham-Kent.

The route enters Lambton County in the municipality of St. Clair, passing through more farmland.  north of the county line, the highway crosses the W. Darcy McKeough Floodway, a channel constructed in 1984 to protect Wallaceburg from flooding.
Highway 40 continues north, parallel to and several kilometres east of the St. Clair River. At Bickford, it swerves slightly to the east while passing between the CF Industries nitrogen fertilizer plant to the west and Bickford Oak Woods Provincial Conservation Reserve to the east.
As the highway approaches the south end of Sarnia, it widens into a divided four-lane expressway and passes through Chemical Valley, the location of several industrial plants.
The route enters Aamjiwnaang First Nation at La Salle Line where the surroundings abruptly switch to forest from a mix of industry and farmland.

At the intersection with Churchill Line, Highway 40 enters the Sarnia city limits and turns east onto the Sarnia Bypass, a four lane divided expressway. Soon thereafter, it gently curves to the north, intersecting Plank Road and becoming Modeland Road. It passes along the western edge of the Sarnia Photovoltaic Power Plant, the largest photovoltaic (solar) power plant in the world in 2010.
The route passes above a CN and VIA rail line as it travels along the eastern rural–urban fringe of the city. After a signalized intersection with Wellington Street, Highway 40 widens to a divided four lane expressway once more just prior to a Parclo A2 interchange with London Line (former Highway 7), then ends at a Parclo B4 interchange with Highway 402 (Exit 6). Modeland Road narrows back to a two lane road and continues north as Lambton County Road 27.

History 

Highway 40 was established at the height of the Great Depression, during the spring of 1934. The subsequent improvement of the roadway employed several dozen men eight hours per day, six days per week at minimum wage as a depression-relief project.
It was created by the assumption of the St. Clair River Road, as well as several lengths of concession road created as a result of statute labour by adjacent settlers as part of the requirements to secure a land deed. On March 28, the road connecting Chatham with Wallaceburg was assumed by the Department of Highways (DHO) and designated King's Highway 40. Just over a month later, on May 2, the DHO assumed the route between Wallaceburg and Sarnia known today as the St. Clair Parkway. The  route connected Highway 2 in Chatham with Highway 7 and Highway 22 in Sarnia.
The designation came just weeks before the 1934 Ontario general election, which saw Lambton West incumbent Conservative Member of the Legislative Assembly Andrew Robinson McMillen replaced by Liberal William Guthrie. As such, it was seen as a fruitless last-ditch attempt to garner votes.

Sarnia Bypass 

In the decade following World War II, automobile use in North America increased dramatically, inundating many highways on the approach to and within urbanized areas with heavy traffic. As a result, freeways and bypasses were constructed throughout the province, allowing drivers not destined for those locations avoid congestion. In 1957, the DHO announced that Highway 402 would be extended east of Sarnia to London, starting with the construction of an interchange at Modeland Road.
This interchange would serve as the terminus for a new bypass of Sarnia.

On May 1, 1963, portions of Modeland Road and Churchill Line were taken over by the DHO and numbered as Highway 40A.
These roads were reconstructed over the following year to provincial standards. On October 25, 1963, the Sarnia Bypass was opened to traffic.
Further construction was carried out until late 1965 to grade the route for future widening and build an overpass of the CN Railway south of Confederation Line,
after which the bypass was renumbered as the northern end of Highway 40;
the former route on the west side of Sarnia, via Brock Street, Vidal Street and Front Street, was subsequently renumbered Highway 40B.
East of the Murphy Road overpass, Highway 402 was re-aligned to bypass the interchange with Highway 40 constructed in 1963;
Exmouth Street was redirected to connect with Highway 7 (London Line), and Quinn Street now follows the former alignment of the freeway.
For the realigned Highway 402, a new interchange was constructed with Highway 40 just north of the original interchange.

St. Clair Parkway 

During the late-1950s, the St. Lawrence Seaway project created a navigable lock system between the Atlantic Ocean and Lake Superior, while simultaneously reclaiming properties along the shoreline to create a continuous parkway. Seeing the potential tourist draw, several groups and organizations, including the district Chamber of Commerce, convened at the second annual conference of the Southwestern Ontario Chambers of Commerce and Boards of Trade in February 1960. Several resolutions were passed, calling for the DHO to create a new Highway 40 several kilometres inland from the St. Clair River and to have the old highway rebuilt as a scenic route.
These resolutions were echoed by Lambton County Council and the 21 municipalities in the county.

Plans for the parkway were crafted over the next several years before being presented to minister of highways Charles MacNaughton in the spring of 1965.
Subsequently, the St. Clair Parkway Commission was formed in 1966.
Around this time, several large chemical refineries, including Union Carbide and S.O.A.P. were built south of Sarnia along the future highway corridor, an area known since the 1940s as Chemical Valley.
Following several years of negotiations with the Aamjiwnaang First Nation (then the Chippewas of Sarnia),
construction of the new inland route of Highway 40 began in July 1972.
A second contract, awarded in 1974, extended construction south an additional  to Lambton County Road 2 (Bentpath Line) near Sombra.

The new Sarnia–Wallaceburg highway was opened to traffic as each contract was completed. The section from Sarnia to Highway 80 was opened in August 1975,
and the section from Highway 80 to Sombra by mid-1977.
The entire C$12.6 million ($ in  dollars) project was opened ceremoniously by Highway Minister James Snow on November 25, 1977; he was late to the ceremony due to a snowstorm.
The old alignment was transferred to the St. Clair Parkway Commission between Sarnia and Sombra in 1979,
and from Sombra to Dufferin Avenue (opposite Walpole Island) by 1982.
The remaining  along Dufferin Avenue to the new Highway 40 was decommissioned between 1984 and 1986. Lambton County designated its portion of the former highway as County Road 33.

Kent County 
Within Wallaceburg, Highway 40 originally followed Murray Street, King Street, McDougal Street across the Sydenham River and James Street. When the Lord Selkirk Bridge was opened November 23, 1950, the highway was rerouted along McNaughton Avenue and across the new bridge.
In 1975, the alignment was briefly changed to Murray Street and the one-way pairing of Wellington and James Streets while the Lord Selkirk Bridge was rehabilitated and McNaughton Avenue widened to four lanes.

Within Chatham, Highway 40 originally followed St. Clair Street and Thames Street to intersect Highway 2 at Fifth Street adjacent to the Thames River.
By 1940, it had been rerouted across the Third Street bridge and along Raleigh Street to end at Richmond Street.
Despite the opening of Highway 401 south of Chatham on October 25, 1963,
Highway 40 was not extended south of Chatham until the end of the decade.

In spring of 1969, the DHO assumed Communication Road south of Highway 401 to Highway 3 in Blenheim,
in exchange for Highway 98, which became Kent County Road 8. Communication Road was numbered Highway 40 in July 1970, although there was no signed connection between Highway 401 and Chatham.
The 1971 Ontario Road Map indicates that this gap had been closed, with Highway 40 following Richmond Street, Queen Street, and Park Avenue East to Communication Road.

Downloads 
As part of a series of budget cuts initiated by premier Mike Harris under his Common Sense Revolution platform in 1995, numerous highways deemed to no longer be of significance to the provincial network were decommissioned and responsibility for the routes transferred to a lower level of government, a process referred to as downloading. Highway 3 was downloaded between Leamington and west of St. Thomas, rendering Highway 40 south of Highway 401 redundant. Accordingly, Highway40 was transferred to Kent County on January 1, 1998.

Major intersections

Suffixed routes

Highway 40A 

See #Sarnia Bypass

Highway 40A was the temporary designation for the Sarnia Bypass between its assumption by the DHO on May 1, 1963, and its completion in late 1965. The DHO maintained the  portion from the Sarnia city limits at Indian Road to Highway 402. When the bypass was completed, it was renumbered as Highway 40.

Highway 40B 

Highway 40B was the designation of the former route of Highway 40 through downtown Sarnia following the opening of the Sarnia Bypass in late 1965. The route followed Vidal Street from Churchill Road northeast, crossing the entrance to the St. Clair Tunnel just south of Campbell Street. It continued along Vidal to Wellington Street, where it turned west then north along Front Street to Highway 402.
The following year, Highway 40B was rerouted from Vidal Street along Confederation Street west to Christina Street and north to Wellington Street.
On August 24, 1979, the Donahue Bridge was opened over the St. Clair Tunnel, and Vidal Street split into a one-way pair with Brock Street to the north of the bridge.
Highway 40B was rerouted along the one-way pairing to London Road then west to Front Street by 1980.
It remained this way until some point between 1992 and 1996, when it was decommissioned as a provincial highway.

Highway 40C 

Highway 40C was signed along Cromwell Street and Front Street in downtown Sarnia briefly during the mid-1960s. It was extended from Exmouth Street to Highway 402 on January 6, 1964.
The 1965 DHO Annual Report indicates that the route began at Vidal Street and ended at Errol Road (which intersects Christina Street but not Front Street), while the 1965 Ontario Road Map indicates that the portion of Front Street north of Exmouth Street was part of Highway 40C. The route does not appear on any other official road maps.

References

External links 

 Highway 40 – Length and Route
 Highway 40 Pictures and Information

040
Roads in Chatham-Kent
Transport in Sarnia